Marsarud (also Romanized as Marsārūd) is a village in Tulem Rural District, Tulem District, Sowme'eh Sara County, Gilan Province, Iran. At the 2006 census, its population was 72, in 23 families.

References 

Populated places in Sowme'eh Sara County